Cirsonella propelaxa is a minute sea snail, a marine gastropod mollusc in the family Skeneidae.

Description
The height of the shell attains 2.5 mm, its diameter 3 mm.

Distribution
This marine species is endemic to New Zealand. It occurs off Chatham Islands.

References

 Powell A. W. B., New Zealand Mollusca, William Collins Publishers Ltd, Auckland, New Zealand 1979 

propelaxa
Gastropods of New Zealand
Gastropods described in 1956